Rodolfo Gaspar Biazon (born April 14, 1935) is a Filipino politician and former Philippine Marine Corps general. He was the Chief of Staff of the Armed Forces of the Philippines (AFP) in early 1991 and then served as a Senator from 1992 to 1995 and from 1998 to 2010. 

During his time in the military, he served as superintendent of the Philippine Military Academy (PMA), commandant of the Philippine Marine Corps, Vice Chief of Staff, and finally Chief of Staff of the AFP. After his stints in the senate, he served as the Representative of Muntinlupa from 2010 to 2016.

Early life and career
Biazon was born on April 14, 1935, in Batac, Ilocos Norte. His father Rufino Biazon, was a doughmaker then, while his mother Juliana Gaspar, was a clotheswasher. His father died and left him along with his mother and three younger sisters when he was seven years old. At a young age of eight, he and his sisters had already experienced hardship, especially during the Japanese regime. Living in a makeshift shanty in Cavite, they had to peddle food, collected bottles and newspapers, which were later sold in order to earn a living for the family. In spite of their condition, it did not stop him from obtaining his education.

He enrolled as a Grade One student at the age of eleven, in 1946. In order to support his education, and at the same time look for ways to earn money, so he went to school in the morning and worked in the afternoon. He would collect seashells in Manila Bay which were in turn sold at the market. He studied in Jose Rizal Elementary School, Pasay, for his primary education where he graduated salutatorian. He continued working, washing clothes for other people in order to sustain his high school education at the Jose Abad Santos High School located at the Arellano University, Pasay in 1955. He also graduated from this school with honors. He stopped doing laundry and instead worked as a laborer in the then Highway 54 (now EDSA), this time to sustain his college education in FEATI where he took mechanical engineering.

He also attended other trainings or schooling which include the TOP Management Program at the Asian Institute of Management; Command and General Staff Course in Quantico, Virginia, U.S.; Crisis Program in California, U.S.; Allied Combat Intelligence Course in Okinawa, Japan; Senior Officer Maintenance Course in Kentucky, U.S.; Amphibious Warfare Course in Quantico, Virginia, U.S. and, Military Instructors in Norfolk, Virginia, United States.

Military career
He entered the Philippine Military Academy in 1957, although he applied and passed for the US Navy. He was the class goat of PMA Class 1961 yet this did not prevent him from achieving his goal.

As a Philippine Marine, he attained the following posts: Superintendent of PMA in 1986–87, Commandant of the Philippine Marines (PMC) in 1987–1989, Commanding General of the NCR Defense Command in 1988–1990, Armed Forces of the Philippines (AFP) Vice Chief of Staff in 1990-91 and Armed Forces of the Philippines Chief of Staff in 1991.

He was assigned in Davao in 1983 during the Marcos administration. It was the time when the trust and confidence of the civilians in the military were returned as he took the initiative to do so.

During his tenure both as the Commanding General of the AFP NCR Defense Command and Commandant of the Philippine Marine Corps, he quelled an attempted coup by the Reform the Armed Forces Movement (RAM), led by Col. Gringo Honasan. He led the Marines and the officers and men of the AFP NCR Defense Command in foiling the coup attempt.

In early 1990, Viva Films began to plan a film based on Gen. Biazon's life, with Eddie Garcia cast as Biazon and Manuel "Fyke" Cinco to direct, though it did not come to fruition.

Gen. Biazon was chosen to be the third Armed Forces Chief of Staff of the 5th Republic, after Fidel V. Ramos and Renato de Villa, and the first one to come from the ranks of the PMC on 1991. Prior to that, he served then also as the Vice Chief of Staff of the AFP under De Villa. He is the first and only AFP Chief of Staff from the Philippine Marine Corps.

Awards during his military service
  Philippine Republic Presidential Unit Citation
  Martial Law Unit Citation
   Distinguished Service Star
   Gold Cross Medal
  Outstanding Achievement Medal
   Bronze Cross Medal
  Military Merit Medals with one spearhead device and four bronze anahaws
   Military Commendation Medals
  Long Service Medal
  Anti-dissidence Campaign Medal
  Luzon Anti Dissidence Campaign Medal
  Visayas Anti-Dissidence Campaign Medal
  Mindanao Anti-dissidence Campaign Medal
  Jolo and Sulu Campaign Medal
  Disaster Relief & Rehabilitation Operation Ribbon
  Combat Commander's Badge
  AFP Parachutist Badge

Congressional career

Senate
He became Senator in the Ninth Congress from 1992 up to 1995. Paul Aquino, the brother of the late Senator Benigno Aquino Jr., was the one who convinced him to run for office.

He was again elected as Senator in 1998 and continues to serve his term up to 2010.

He was the Chairman of the Senate Committee on National Defense and Security and Committee on Urban Planning, Housing and Resettlement.

Aside from this, he holds the following positions in the Senate: Vice-Chair of the Committees on Agriculture and Food and Foreign Relations, and a Member of 15 other Senate Committees.

He is also the President of the Asian Regional Council Global Parliamentarians on Habitat, the Vice-President for Asia Global Parliamentarians on Habitat, the Co-chairperson of the Philippine Legislators' Committee on Population and Development Foundation, Inc. (PLCPD) and a member of the Commission on Appointments.

Biazon run for re-election and won in 2004 narrowly beating Senator Robert Barbers by margin of 10,685. Barbers filed an electoral protest but died within the year. Biazon continued filling numerous bills and resolution many of them were passed into law, some of them:

 Republic Act No. 9208, Anti-Trafficking in Persons Act,
 Republic Act No. 9161, reforming the renting industry
 Republic Act No. 7835, Comprehensive and Integrated Shelter Finance Act,
 Republic Act No. 7898, An Act providing for the Modernization of the Armed Forces of the Philippines,
 Republic Act No. 7742, changing the mandatory membership to the Pag-Ibig Fund
 Republic Act No. 7901, creation of the region of Caraga (Region XIII)
 Republic Act No. 7889, establishing the University of the Philippines Mindanao
 Republic Act No. 7863, the Home Guaranty Corporation Law
 Republic Act No. 7691, Expanding the Jurisdiction of MTC's, MCTC and METC,
 Joint Resolution No. 7, increasing the subsistence allowance of soldiers and policemen,
 Republic Act No. 8763, amending the Home Guarantee Corporation Act
 Republic Act No. 9040, tax exemption of allowances and benefits for members of the Armed Forces of the Philippines
 Republic Act No. 9049, granting monthly gratuity and privileges to awarded of the Medal of Valor

He was also one of the main proponent of the Reproductive Health Bill.

House of Representatives
Biazon ran for the open seat of his son, Ruffy in the lone district in 2010 as he was term-limited. Ruffy, also term-limited ran, instead for the Senate but lost at fourteenth place. He faced former broadcaster Dong Puno. He was elected with 46% of the vote. His term started on June 30, 2010. He was then reelected in 2013. He decided not to seek reelection in 2016.

Personal life
He met Monserrat Narag Bunoan as a classmate in the Philippine Military Academy. Eight months after his graduation in the Philippine Military Academy, he eventually married Monserrat or "Monchie" as she is called on December 3, 1961.

They have three children, Rita Rosanna (first runner-up on Binibining Pilipinas 1985), Rino Rudiyardo and Rozzano Rufino (incumbent Muntinlupa mayor), who were all successful in their respective fields.

References

External links
Philippine Senators' Biography - Senator Rodolfo Biazon
12th Congress of the Philippines

|-

1935 births
Living people
People from Muntinlupa
People from Batac
Ilocano people
Filipino generals
Philippine Marine Corps personnel
20th-century Filipino engineers
Philippine Military Academy alumni
Senators of the 14th Congress of the Philippines
Senators of the 13th Congress of the Philippines
Senators of the 9th Congress of the Philippines
Members of the House of Representatives of the Philippines from Muntinlupa
Chairmen of the Joint Chiefs (Philippines)
Aksyon Demokratiko politicians
Liberal Party (Philippines) politicians
Laban ng Demokratikong Pilipino politicians
Arellano University alumni
Senators of the 11th Congress of the Philippines
Senators of the 12th Congress of the Philippines
Corazon Aquino administration personnel